is a passenger railway station in located in the city of Habikino,  Osaka Prefecture, Japan, operated by the private railway operator Kintetsu Railway.

Lines
Komagatani Station is served by the Minami Osaka Line, and is located 20.0 rail kilometers from the starting point of the line at Ōsaka Abenobashi Station.

Station layout
The station was consists of two opposed side platforms connected by a level crossing.

Platforms

Adjacent stations

History
Komagatani Station opened on March 29, 1929.

Passenger statistics
In fiscal 2018, the station was used by an average of 1,417 passengers daily.

Surrounding area
Habikino City Komagatani Elementary School
 Choya Umeshu Headquarters
 Osaka Prefectural Kaifukan High School

See also
List of railway stations in Japan

References

External links

 Kintetsu: Takawashi Station 

Railway stations in Japan opened in 1929
Railway stations in Osaka Prefecture
Habikino